Childebert III (or IV), called the Just (c.678/679 – 23 April 711), was the son of Theuderic III and Clotilda (or Doda) and sole king of the Franks (694–711). He was seemingly but a puppet of the mayor of the palace, Pepin of Heristal, though his placita show him making judicial decisions of his own will, even against the Arnulfing clan.  His nickname has no comprehensible justification except possibly as a result of these judgements, but the Liber Historiae Francorum calls him a "famous man" and "the glorious lord of good memory, Childebert, the just king."
He had a son named Dagobert, who succeeded him, as Dagobert III but his wife was not Edonne, the invention of later fantasists. It is possible, though not likely, that Chlothar IV was also his son.  He spent almost his entire life in a royal villa on the Oise.

In 708, during his reign of sixteen years, the bishop of Avranches, Saint Aubert, founded the monastery of Mont-Saint-Michel at the urging of the Archangel Michael.

Upon his death on 23 April 711, southern Gaul began to grow independent: Burgundy under Bishop Savaric of Auxerre, Aquitaine under Duke Odo the Great, and Provence under Antenor. He died at St Etienne, Loire, France. He was buried in the church of St Stephen at Choisy-au-Bac, near Compiègne.

Notes

External links

From Merovingians to Carolingians: Dynastic Change in Frankia.

Merovingian kings
7th-century births
711 deaths
7th-century Frankish kings
8th-century Frankish kings